The 2020 Carlow Senior Hurling Championship was the 91st staging of the Carlow Senior Hurling Championship since its establishment by the Carlow County Board in 1927. The championship began on 24 July 2020 and ended on 30 August 2020.

St. Mullin's entered the championship as the defending champions.

The final was played on 30 August 2020 at Netwatch Cullen Park, between Mount Leinster Rangers and Ballinkillen, in what was their first ever meeting in a final in 19 years. Mount Leinster Rangers won the match by 3-21 to 0-12 to claim their ninth championship title overall and first title in two years.

Results

Final

References

External links
 Carlow GAA website

Carlow Senior Hurling Championship
Carlow Senior Hurling Championship
Carlow Senior Hurling Championship